The 2015 Men's Indoor Hockey World Cup was the fourth edition of this tournament. It was played on 4–8 February 2015 in Leipzig, Germany.

Germany was the three-time defending champion.

The Netherlands defeated Austria 3–2 in the final to win their first title.

Results
The schedule was released on 10 October 2014.

All times are local Central European Time (UTC+02:00)

First round

Pool A

Pool B

Ninth to twelfth place classification

9–12th place semi-finals

Eleventh and twelfth place

Ninth and tenth place

Second round

Fifth to eighth place

Quarter-finals

Fifth to eighth place classification

5–8th place semifinals

Seventh and eighth place

Fifth and sixth place

First to fourth place classification

Semi-finals

Third and fourth place

Final

Final standings

Awards
Most Valuable Player: 
Top Scorer: 
Best Goalkeeper: 
Best U21 Player:

See also
2015 Women's Indoor Hockey World Cup

References

External links
Official website
Official FIH website

2015 Men
World Cup
2015 Men's Indoor Hockey World Cup
2015 Men's Indoor Hockey World Cup
Indoor Hockey World Cup Men
2010s in Saxony